Summercross may refer to:
Sommarkrysset, Swedish tv programme
Summercross, band featuring former UK politician Greg Mulholland